Cameron Seth (born 21 April 1994 in Ontario) is a Canadian professional squash player. As of May 2019, he was ranked number 140 in the world. He won the 2019 CityView Open.

References

1994 births
Living people
Canadian male squash players
21st-century Canadian people